Bennetts Mill(s) may refer to:
Bennetts Mills, New Jersey
Bennetts Mill, New Jersey
Bennetts Mill, Virginia
Bennett's Mill, a former textile manufacturing factory in London, England